The 2012 Dallas Cup was the 33rd since its establishment. 12 teams participated in the tournament. The competition was sponsored by Dr Pepper.

Participating teams

From AFC:

  Kashiwa Reysol

From CONCACAF:

  Tigres
 
  Dallas Texans
  FC Dallas
  Santa Clara Sporting

From CONMEBOL:

  Coritiba FC
  Bolívar

From UEFA:

  Manchester United
  Everton
  Paris St Germain
  Eintracht Frankfurt

Standings

Group A

Group B

Group C

Semifinal

Championship

Top scorer

External links 
 2012 Dr Pepper Dallas Cup XXXIII

References 

2012
Dallas Cup, 2012
Dallas Cup